Liang Lingguang (November 1916 – 25 February 2006) was a Chinese Communist revolutionary and politician. An anti-Japanese activist in the 1930s, he led a guerrilla force under the New Fourth Army during the Second Sino-Japanese War, and rose to Chief of Staff of the 29th Corps of the People's Liberation Army during the Chinese Civil War.

After the founding of the People's Republic of China in 1949, Liang served as the first Mayor of Xiamen, Vice Governor of Fujian, and later Minister of Light Industry (1977–1980). During the reform and opening era, he was transferred to Guangdong province, where he served as Mayor of Guangzhou (1980–1983), Governor of Guangdong (1983–1985), and President of Jinan University (1983–1985). He was one of the pioneering reformist leaders who propelled Guangdong's economic rise in the 1980s.

Early life 
Liang was born in November 1916 in Wufeng Town, Yongchun County, Fujian, Republic of China. His father, a merchant, died when he was little. His older brother Liang Piyun, who had studied in Japan, brought him to Shanghai to study at Lida School.

Anti-Japanese activism 
When the Empire of Japan occupied Northeast China in 1931 following the Mukden Incident, Liang participated in anti-Japanese activities organized by the underground Communist Party of China, and was expelled by his high school. He moved to Xiamen, Fujian, where he worked as an editor at the magazine Pinghua and published articles condemning Japanese aggression.

After Pinghua was shut down by the Kuomintang government, Liang returned to Shanghai to continue his education, and lived at the off-campus dorm of Jinan University, then located in Zhenru in the outskirts of Shanghai. In 1935, when the December 9th Movement broke out in Beijing against Japanese encroachment in North China, Liang joined Jinan students to petition the Kuomintang government in Nanjing to actively resist Japanese aggression. On the train to Nanjing, he met fellow petitioner Zhu Hanzhang, a Jinan University student who later became his wife.

In the summer of 1936, Liang moved to Kuala Lumpur, British Malaya. There he taught at Zunkong Middle School founded by his brother Piyun, and organized anti-Japanese groups such as the Selangor Anti-Imperialism Union under the guidance of the Malayan Communist Party.

Wartime career 
When Japan launched its full-scale invasion of China in July 1937, Liang returned to China to join the resistance. He enlisted in the New Fourth Army and fought in the guerrilla war in northern Jiangsu province. In 1940, he was appointed the county magistrate of Rugao and joined the Communist Party of China. He was later appointed county magistrate of Nantong and fought many battles against the forces of Japan and the puppet Wang Jingwei regime, even temporarily taking over the Japanese-occupied county seat of Haimen.

He fought in major battles including the Battle of Huangqiao, the Huaihai campaign, the Yangtze River Crossing Campaign, the Shanghai Campaign, and the Battle of Fuzhou.

People's Republic of China 
After the founding of the People's Republic of China in 1949, Liang was appointed the first Mayor of Xiamen, Fujian, and worked to restore industrial production after the end of the civil war. In March 1956, he became Vice Governor of Fujian and a member of its provincial party standing committee. He was dismissed during the Cultural Revolution, but was restored to the party standing committee in early 1975, and appointed Deputy Director of the Provincial Revolutionary Committee. In November 1977, Liang was transferred to the national government to serve as Minister of Light Industry.

Guangdong Province 
In November 1980, at the beginning of the reform and opening era, Liang was transferred to Guangdong together with Ren Zhongyi, to replace Xi Zhongxun and Yang Shangkun, who had been transferred to Beijing. Liang served as First Party Secretary and Mayor of Guangzhou, the provincial capital, while Ren was appointed the provincial Party Chief. In March 1983, Liang was promoted to Governor of Guangdong, succeeding Liu Tianfu. He concurrently served as President of Jinan University, which had been reestablished in Guangzhou. He stepped down as governor in July 1985 and was succeeded by Ye Xuanping. Ren, Liu, Liang, and Ye were all considered reform pioneers who propelled the economic development of Guangdong in the 1980s.

From 1985 to 1988, Liang served as Director of the Guangdong Provincial Advisory Commission, and concurrently as the first chairman of China Travel Service Group Corporation (CTS) of Hong Kong. In May 1988, he was elected a member of the Standing Committee of the 7th National People's Congress and served as Vice Director of the Overseas Chinese Affairs Committee of the NPC.

Liang was a member of the 12th Central Committee of the Communist Party of China, and a member of the 2nd, 5th, 6th, and 7th National People's Congresses.

Liang died on 25 February 2006 in Guangzhou, aged 89.

References 

1916 births
2006 deaths
Governors of Guangdong
Mayors of Guangzhou
Politicians from Quanzhou
People's Republic of China politicians from Fujian
Chinese expatriates in Malaysia
Members of the 12th Central Committee of the Chinese Communist Party
Academic staff of Jinan University
Government ministers of the People's Republic of China
New Fourth Army
Delegates to the 2nd National People's Congress
Delegates to the 5th National People's Congress
Delegates to the 6th National People's Congress
Members of the Standing Committee of the 7th National People's Congress
Mayors of Xiamen
Chinese military personnel of World War II
Presidents of Jinan University